Church Quarter is a historic home located at Doswell, Hanover County, Virginia. It was built in 1843, and is a one-story, three-bay, gable-roof, log dwelling.  It has exposed logs with V-notching and two exterior end chimneys.  Also on the property are contributing two late-19th / early-20th century
outbuildings and the ruins of a brick orangery, known locally as the flower house.

The Scotchtown Chapter of the National Society Daughters of the American Revolution purchased Church Quarter in 1969 and has worked to restore the cabin and maintain it as a meeting house for the chapter. It was listed on the National Register of Historic Places in 2000.

References

External links
Church Quarter, State Route 738, Ashland, Hanover County, VA: 1 photo at Historic American Buildings Survey

Houses on the National Register of Historic Places in Virginia
Houses completed in 1843
Houses in Hanover County, Virginia
National Register of Historic Places in Hanover County, Virginia
Historic American Buildings Survey in Virginia
1843 establishments in Virginia